Chris Hill (born 8 January 1945) is a British disc jockey. He worked at the club Lacy Lady in Ilford, as well as at the Goldmine Canvey Island and was the head of the 'Soul Mafia' a group of DJs which included Greg Edwards, DJ Froggy, Jeff Young and Robbie Vincent, in London and the South East of England into the early 1980s. He had a major input into the creation of the British 'Brit Funk' music scene of the late 1970s and early 1980s.

Career

Early DJ experience
Hill's first residency was at The Cock public house in Orsett, Essex in the late 1960s where he would play jazz records.  The Canvey Island Goldmine owner, Stan Barrett and manager Kenny Faulkner came to The Cock and offered Hill the residency. Hill stated: "They’d heard about me and when I started at The Goldmine on Canvey Island in November 1972, people there didn’t understand a ‘Soul’ night."

In 1975-1976, he promoted his 'swing revival nights' playing the music of Count Basie, Jimmie Lunceford, Chick Webb and Benny Goodman. During this short period, which was promoted by Hill, the Goldmine had a monopoly on GI uniforms and scarlet-lipped jive-dolls whilst promoting the music of Glenn Miller and those swing revival nights.  Club goers followed the brief trend of 'swing fever' for a few months until it attracted the attention of The Sun newspaper, after which the trend ended returning to Soul, Funk, and Jazz.

Having completed a second stint back on Canvey's Goldmine in the early 1980s, Hill decided to quit the club scene in 1985 and concentrate on his Ensign duties with Sinéad O'Connor whom he had recently discovered. In 1987, he was offered a weekend job in Hamburg on Radio 107 and created SoulBeat.

Hill was a key figure on the Brit funk scene of the late 1970s and early 1980s. He worked as a record company man behind many of the first Brit Funk tracks that would be central to the Brit Funk movement and launched many acts on the Ensign record label alongside the late Nigel Grainge who founded the label. Bands have included Light of the World and Incognito. Alexis Petridis has described him as "perhaps the scene’s biggest and most controversial name, with a divisive penchant for onstage wackiness". However Hill has also been praised by fellow DJ Gilles Peterson, who stated that he was "an amazing DJ" musically and said that he was the British equivalent of Larry Levan.

Chart success and British Hustle
In 1975 he released a "break-in" novelty record, in the style of Dickie Goodman, called "Renta Santa", which became a hit single in the UK during the Christmas season. On the record Hill narrates using various artists' song clips to tell a Christmas story. The record peaked at No. 10 on the UK Singles Chart in December of that year. Early the following year, he released a cover version of The Coasters' hit "Yakety Yak", with the innuendo-laden "Ride On!" featured on its 'B' side that failed to chart. However, later on, his second Christmas record, "Bionic Santa", cut with audio segments in a similar style to "Renta Santa", was more successful, again with "Ride On!" on the flip-side. It also peaked at No. 10 in the chart in December 1976. Both tracks, which included snippets of other hits of the time, were released on the Philips label.

His final release, "Disco Santa", again in the same style, released for Christmas 1978, failed to chart. That same year a short film was made about British soul music called British Hustle filmed in the Clouds Nightclub in Brixton. Hill appeared in the film playing 'Swanee whistle' over the records whilst encouraging dancers to form human pyramids.

Since 1979
Hill still works as a DJ and until 2011 ran the Lacy Lady in Ilford, London. Hill also has a major involvement in the 'Caister Soul Weekenders', a DJ event which began in 1979, which has taken place twice each year, initially in Caister-on-Sea but, in later years, at the Vauxhall Holiday Park in Great Yarmouth. He has worked on these with his long term event collaborator and music promoter Brian Rix.

Discography

Singles

References

External links

Chris Hill on Myspace

1945 births
Living people
British radio personalities
British DJs